Richard Frank Rusteck (born July 12, 1941) is an American former left-handed pitcher in Major League Baseball who played for the New York Mets during the  season. He is most widely known as one of the few pitchers to deliver a shutout in his first major league game, which was in a match against the Cincinnati Reds on June 10, 1966.

Playing career

Early years
Parsons was born in Chicago, Illinois. The 1963 Notre Dame graduate made three stops in 1965 en route to the New York Mets.  All three contained a large measure of success.  He began the year at Greenville, SC with a 2.14 earned run average in 21 innings.  Moving on to Auburn, NY, he fashioned a 3-0 record in 44 innings and a 1.64 earned run average.  His last stop was Williamsport (Eastern League) where he completed the year throwing 50 innings with a 1.98 earned run average although he won only one of six decisions.  He was 6-4 at Jacksonville in 1966.

New York Mets
Rusteck was 24 years old when he broke into the big leagues on June 10, 1966, with the New York Mets. After his impressive debut, he gave up five runs in one inning against the St. Louis Cardinals in his second game for his first major league loss. He pitched in six more games without a victory before returning to the minor leagues.

Back to the minors
Rusteck spent another eleven years in the minor leagues hoping to regain his initial success. While it earned him a shot at Triple-A in the Philadelphia Phillies organization the following year, his  ballooned to 5.16. After sitting out the  season, he played for four seasons in the independent Northwest League with the Portland Mavericks and Salem Senators before retiring.

References

External links
Entry at UltimateMets.com

1941 births
Living people
Major League Baseball pitchers
New York Mets players
Portland Mavericks players
Baseball players from Chicago
Notre Dame Fighting Irish baseball players
Salem Senators players
Florida Instructional League Mets players
Auburn Mets players
Cafeteros de Córdoba players
American expatriate baseball players in Mexico
Charlotte Hornets (baseball) players
Dorados de Chihuahua players
Eugene Emeralds players
Evansville Triplets players
Greenville Mets players
Jacksonville Suns players
Memphis Blues players
Rochester Red Wings players
Salinas Mets players
Williamsport Mets players
Winter Haven Mets players